Gullhaug is a district in the municipality of Bærum, Norway. Its population (2007) is 3,468. The area was developed with housing in the 1980s.

References

Villages in Akershus
Neighbourhoods in Bærum